Baba Gurbaksh Singh (his first name is alternatively spelt as Gurbax) was a Sikh warrior from the 18th century who served under the Shaheedan Misl of the Sikh confederacy. Gurbaksh Singh along with 29 other Sikh warriors led a last stand against the Afghan and Baloch forces on December 1, 1764 at Amritsar. It was in this skirmish that Baba Gurbaksh Singh along with 29 other Sikhs were killed.

Early life 
Gurbaksh Singh was born in the village of Lil in Amritsar district on April 10, 1688 and was the son of Dasaundha and Mai Lachchhami Gurbaksh Singh was a contemporary of the 10th Sikh guru,Guru Gobind Singh and was initiated into the Khalsa during the Vaisakhi of 1699. He completed his religious education under Bhai Mani Singh and he would soon join the Shaheedan Misl under Baba Deep Singh. Gurbaksh Singh would lead a group of Sikh warriors who were famous for their bravery and gallantry against both Mughal and Afghan armies.

Last Stand In Amritsar (1764) 

From 1763 to 1764,The Sikh misls would greatly expanded their territory over the region of Punjab. The Sikhs would successfully occupy Lahore and expand their territory into Multan and Derajat. This greatly weakened Afghan rule over Punjab which caused Ahmad Shah Abdali to launch a seventh invasion into the Indian Subcontinent.

Ahmad Shah Abdali arrived in Punjab and reached Eminabad.It was at Eminabad that Ahmad Shah was Joined by his Baloch ally Nasir Khan.Ahmad Shah Abdali commanded a force numbering 18,000 while Nasir Khan commanded a force numbering 12,000. The Afghan and Baloch forces marched towards Lahore in which where they got into a Skirmish with the Sikhs under the command of Charat Singh Sukerchakia. 

Ahmad Shah heard news that the Sikhs had retreated towards Amritsar.Ahmad Shah arrived in Amritsar on December 1, 1764 however the Afghan forces did not come across any large gathering of Sikhs. Baba Gurbaksh Singh,Nihal Singh,Basant Singh,Man Singh along with 26 other Sikhs had stayed in Amritsar to fight a last stand against the Afghan and Baloch forces. 

The Afghans were soon attacked by 30 Sikhs lead by Baba Gurbaksh Singh at Shri Harmandir Sahib.It was in this skirmish that Baba Gurbaksh Singh along with the 29 Sikh defenders were killed.

Legacy 
The remains of Baba Gurbaksh Singh along with the other dead sikhs were cremated and a memorial called Shaheedganj was built to commemorate the fallen Sikhs.

See also 

 Nihang
 Martyrdom and Sikhism

References 

Amritsar district
18th century in the Durrani Empire
Military history of India
1764 in India
Conflicts in 1764
1688 births
1764 deaths
Sikh warriors